Dario Penne (17 February 1938 – 15 February 2023) was an Italian actor and voice dubbing artist. He dubbed the voices of Anthony Hopkins and Michael Caine in most of their performances, as well as Bender in Futurama.

Biography
Penne usually dubbed characters into the Italian language. One of the roles he is best known for is Bender Bending Rodríguez in the Italian-Language version of Futurama. He also dubbed Emmett "Doc" Brown in Back to the Future Part II and Back to the Future Part III, replacing Ferruccio Amendola. Among the most popular actors he dubbed include Michael Caine, Anthony Hopkins, Christopher Lloyd, Tommy Lee Jones and Ben Kingsley.

His most other popular dubbing roles include Agent K in the Men in Black movies, Judge Doom in Who Framed Roger Rabbit, Alfred Pennyworth in the Dark Knight trilogy films and Sentinel Prime in Transformers: Dark of the Moon.

Penne died on 15 February 2023, two days before his 85th birthday.

Dubbing roles

Animation
Bender Bending Rodríguez in Futurama (seasons 1-7x13)
Bender Bending Rodríguez in Futurama: Bender's Big Score
Bender Bending Rodríguez in Futurama: The Beast With a Billion Backs
Bender Bending Rodríguez in Futurama: Bender's Game
Bender Bending Rodríguez in Futurama: Into the Wild Green Yonder
Agent K in Men in Black: The Series
Eduardo in Marsupilami
The Dentist in Finding Nemo
Django in Ratatouille
Finn McMissile in Cars 2
Hovis in The Tale of Despereaux
Pagemaster in The Pagemaster
Tony in Alpha and Omega
Herod in The Star
Merlin in Sofia the First
Grand Duke of Owls in Rock-a-Doodle
Dr. Eggman in Sonic X
Aristotle in Reign: The Conqueror
Principal Pixiefrog in My Gym Partner's a Monkey
Joe in A Christmas Carol
Warden's Cat in The Animals of Farthing Wood
King Mumbo Jumbo in ChalkZone

Live action
Tim Comell in Desperate Hours
Hannibal Lecter in The Silence of the Lambs
Hannibal Lecter in Hannibal
Hannibal Lecter in Red Dragon
Odin in Thor
Odin in Thor: The Dark World
Odin in Thor: Ragnarok
Alfred Pennyworth in Batman Begins
Alfred Pennyworth in The Dark Knight
Alfred Pennyworth in The Dark Knight Rises
Agent K in Men in Black
Agent K in Men in Black II
Agent K in Men in Black 3
Judge Doom in Who Framed Roger Rabbit
Emmett "Doc" Brown in Back to the Future Part II
Emmett "Doc" Brown in Back to the Future Part III
Emmett "Doc" Brown in A Million Ways to Die in the West
Nearly Headless Nick in Harry Potter and the Philosopher's Stone
Nearly Headless Nick in Harry Potter and the Chamber of Secrets 
Samuel Gerard in The Fugitive
Samuel Gerard in U.S. Marshals
Sentinel Prime in Transformers: Dark of the Moon
John Quincy Adams in Amistad
James Stevens in The Remains of the Day
C. S. Lewis in Shadowlands
William Ludlow in Legends of the Fall
Charles Morse in The Edge
Don Diego de la Vega in The Mask of Zorro
William Parrish in Meet Joe Black
Dr. Ethan Powell in Instinct
Titus Andronicus in Titus
Mission Commander Swanbeck in Mission: Impossible 2
Ted Brautigan in Hearts in Atlantis
Officer Oakes in Bad Company
Coleman Silk in The Human Stain
Ptolemy I Soter in Alexander
Robert in Proof
Burt Munro in The World's Fastest Indian
Judge Irwin in All the King's Men
John in Bobby
Theodore "Ted" Crawford in Fracture
King Hrothgar in Beowulf
Felix Bonhoeffer in Slipstream
Sir John Talbot in The Wolfman
Adam Gund in The City of Your Final Destination
Alfie Shepridge in You Will Meet a Tall Dark Stranger
Father Lucas Trevant in The Rite
John in 360
Dr. Edward Bailey in Red 2
Methuselah in Noah
Freddy Heineken in Kidnapping Mr. Heineken
John Clancy in Solace
Arthur Denning in Misconduct
Hagen Kahl in Collide
Sir Edmund Burton in Transformers: The Last Knight
Robert Ford in Westworld
Michael Jennings in On Deadly Ground
Ray Say in Little Voice
Dr. Wilbur Larch in The Cider House Rules
Nigel Powers in Austin Powers in Goldmember
Pierre Brossard in The Statement
Robert Spritzel in The Weather Man
Jasper in Children of Men
Mr. Hobbs in Flawless
Stephen Miles in Inception
Matthew Morgan in Mr. Morgan's Last Love
Professor Brand in Interstellar
Arthur / Chester King in Kingsman: The Secret Service
Fred Ballinger in Youth
Father Dolan in The Last Witch Hunter
Joe Harding in Going in Style
John Neville in Eyes of Laura Mars
Thomas Boyette in The Package
Roy Foltrigg in The Client
Henry Marshall in Blue Sky
William Strannix in Under Siege
Steve Butler in Heaven & Earth
Hayes Lawrence Hodges II in Rules of Engagement
Travis Lehman in Double Jeopardy
L. T. Bonham in The Hunted
Samuel Jones in The Missing
Pete Perkins in The Three Burials of Melquiades Estrada
Robert Stansfield in The Family
Dr. Micah Franks in Criminal
Robert Dewey in Jason Bourne
Max Adams in Mechanic: Resurrection
Bruno Daley in Why Me?
Bill Burns in Eight Men Out
Henry Sikorsky in The Dream Team
Charlie Wilcox in Suburban Commando
Switchblade Sam in Dennis the Menace
Jimmy in Twenty Bucks
Dennis Van Welker in Camp Nowhere
Mr. Dewey in The Pagemaster
Dr. Heep in Baby Geniuses
Ray in Interstate 60
Carl Goodman in Piranha 3D
Cosmo in Sneakers
Nicholas Templeton in Photographing Fairies
Amos in The Assignment
Don Logan in Sexy Beast
Graydon in What Planet Are You From?
Specialist in A.I. Artificial Intelligence
Massoud Amir Behrani in House of Sand and Fog
Grinko in Transsiberian
Dr. Jeffrey Squires in The Wackness
Dr. John Cawley in Shutter Island
Georges Méliès in Hugo
William Donohue in Eraser
Charles Keating in The People vs. Larry Flynt
Alan Rittenhouse in Deep Impact
Joseph Campbell in The General's Daughter
Priest in The Bachelor
J. Robert Fowler in The Sum of All Fears
Warden Hal Moores in The Green Mile
George H. W. Bush in W.
Ogden Phipps in Secretariat
Sir Benjamin Lockwood in Jurassic World: Fallen Kingdom
Prof. Edward Johnston in Timeline
George Sibley in Six Feet Under
Dr. Arthur Arden in American Horror Story: Asylum
Thatcher Karsten in Betrayal
Cardinal Michael Spencer in The Young Pope
Walter Dean in Air Force One
Lando Calrissian in Star Wars: Episode V – The Empire Strikes Back
Khan Noonien Singh in Star Trek II: The Wrath of Khan
Zefram Cochrane in Star Trek: First Contact
Blain in Predator
Dr. William Weir in Event Horizon
Vito Cornelius in The Fifth Element
Chief George Earle in Demolition Man
Bill Rico in Starship Troopers
Robert McKee in Adaptation
Robert Crawford in Finding Forrester
The Entity in Five Moons Square
Shahid in The Stone Merchant
Léon Sée in Carnera: The Walking Mountain
Siniscalco Barozzi in Barbarossa
Gregor in Dead Man Down
Marco d'Aviano in The Day of the Siege: September Eleven 1683
Braque in I Looked in Obituaries
Dante Alter Ego in The Mystery of Dante
Pekwarsky in Wanted
Siegfried in Get Smart
Terrence Bundley in Yes Man
Thompson in The Adjustment Bureau
Arthur Harris in Song for Marion
John Canaday in Big Eyes
Bruno Bischofberger in Basquiat
Paul Kaufman in Land of the Dead
John Canyon in Space Truckers
King Koopa in Super Mario Bros.
The Deacon in Waterworld
Frank in Palermo Shooting
Donald Greenleaf in Swing Vote
Robert in The Comfort of Strangers
Raimundo Tempio in The Funeral
Raymond Perkins in Excess Baggage
Umberto Bevalaqua in Illuminata
Stanley Jacobellis in Gigli
Nat Parker in Five Dollars a Day
Hans Kieslowski in Seven Psychopaths
Warren Sharp in Eddie the Eagle
Pieter van Ruijven in Girl with a Pearl Earring
James Manning in Separate Lies
John Webster in Ripley Under Ground
Sir Graham Dashwood in The Best Exotic Marigold Hotel
Bolek in Polish Wedding
D'Artagnan in The Man in the Iron Mask
Satan in End of Days
Charlie Miller in Shade
Chorus in Henry V
Probert in Gosford Park
Derek Jacobi in Hereafter
Narrator in Anonymous
Owen Morshead in My Week with Marilyn
Count Fernando D'Ailieres in Grace of Monaco
Mr. Yaffe in Tomb Raider
Harold Oxley in Indiana Jones and the Kingdom of the Crystal Skull
Old Man in Immortals 
The Priest in Jackie
Doctor Murnau in Kafka
Baron Alphonse Frankenstein in Mary Shelley's Frankenstein
Naville in A Life Less Ordinary
Gideon Largeman in Garden State
Simeon Weisz Lord of War
Dan Wanamaker in What Women Want
Owen Brewster in The Aviator
Ralph Metz in Resurrecting the Champ
Arthur Shaw in Tower Heist 
Ira Levinson The Longest Ride
Samuel the Sheep in Charlotte's Web
Ben Shockley in The Gauntlet
Harry Callahan in The Dead Pool 
Frank Horrigan in In the Line of Fire
Éamon de Valera in Michael Collins
Lord Lionel Shabandar in Gambit
Ronald Reagan in The Butler 
Louis XIV of France in A Little Chaos
Albert "Burt" Grusinsky in We Own the Night
Martin Cash in Jack Reacher
Chris Bolton in In Dubious Battle
Ben Lewin in It's My Turn
Charlie in King of California 
Billy Gerson in  Last Vegas
Professor Dave Jennings in Animal House
Bartholomew in The Pillars of the Earth 
Michel Dorn in Crossing Lines
Drew Blakeley in The Dogs of War  
Bob Barnes in Platoon
J. Paul Getty in All the Money in the World
Deputy Kovacs in The Grand Budapest Hotel
Count Dracula / Vlad the Impaler in Bram Stoker's Dracula
Stepan in Eastern Promises
The narrator in Our Planet
Anthony in The Father

Video games
Bender Bending Rodríguez in Futurama

References

External links

 
 
 

1938 births
2023 deaths
Actors from Trieste
Italian male voice actors
Italian male film actors
Italian male television actors
Italian voice directors
20th-century Italian male actors
21st-century Italian male actors